The Basilica of la Asunción de Nuestra Señora (Spanish: Basílica de la Asunción de Nuestra Señora) is a gothic basilica located in Colmenar Viejo, Spain. It was declared Bien de Interés Cultural in 1997.

References 

Basilica churches in Spain
Asuncion de Nuestra Senora
Bien de Interés Cultural landmarks in the Community of Madrid